Gerda Schmidt-Panknin (9 August 1920 – 5 March 2021) was a German painter. The artist lived and worked in Kappeln. She studied at the Bremen art academy in the 1940s.

Works 
Painting was the main media of Gerda Schmidt-Panknin. She preferred to combine oil or acrylic painting with other techniques like crayon. In the paintings of the 1960s to the 1980s she mixed sand and other materials into the paint. Since the 1950s and her first travels to Greece these travel experiences (later to USSR, Scandinavia, Iceland and Greenland) were the main inspiration for her work.

Influence 
Due to her practice as art teacher, Schmidt-Panknin influenced many younger artists like Peter Nagel or Nicolaus Schmidt.

Exhibitions (selection) 
 1961 City Museum, Flensburg
 1962 Stegi Kalon Technon, Athens
 1969 Städtisches Gustav-Lübcke-Museum, Hamm
 1969 Apenrade Museum, Apenrade
 1972 Otto-Pankok-Museum, Hünxe
 1983 Senderjyland Arts Museum, Tondern
 1984 National Museum, Reykjavik
 1985 Kunstsalen, Fredericia
 1986 Art Gallery Gloria, Nicosia, Cyprus
 1986 Atatürk Center, Nicosia, Cyprus
 1990 Art Forum, Kappeln/Schlei
 1991 Art Museum, Murmansk, USSR
 1993 Ontario Goethe Society, Toronto, Canada
 1998 Kunstcentrum "TweeWezen", Enkhuizen, Netherlands
 2003 Gallery of BASF Schwarzheide
 2020 , Husum (on the occasion of her 100th birthday)

References

External links 
 Review, exhibitions, biography (German)

1920 births
2021 deaths
20th-century German painters
21st-century German painters
German centenarians
People from Herzogtum Lauenburg
People from the Province of Schleswig-Holstein
Women centenarians